Simon Donohue (12 February 1879 – 17 January 1959) was an Irish hurler. He was a member of the Wexford team that won the All-Ireland Championship in 1910.

Honours

Wexford
All-Ireland Senior Hurling Championship (1): 1910
Leinster Senior Hurling Championship (2): 1901, 1910

References

1879 births
1959 deaths
Wexford inter-county hurlers
All-Ireland Senior Hurling Championship winners